Xavier Fagnon is a French actor who specializes in dubbing.

Biography

Dubbing roles

Theatrical animation
Over the Hedge – Doctor Dennis (Joel McCrary)/Nugent (Brian Stepanek)
Paprika – Doctor Kōsaku Tokita (Tōru Furuya)
Madagascar - Skipper (Tom McGrath)
Meet the Robinsons - Uncle Art (Adam West)Kung Fu Panda - Master Mantis (Seth Rogen)Madagascar: Escape 2 Africa - Skipper (Tom McGrath)Up - Alpha (Bob Peterson)Kung Fu Panda 2 - Master Mantis (Seth Rogen)Madagascar 3: Europe's Most Wanted - Skipper (Tom McGrath)Ice Age: Continental Drift - Flynn (Nick Frost)Hotel Transylvania - Frankenstein (Kevin James)Epic - Grub (Chris O'Dowd)Monsters University - Sulley (John Goodman)Penguins of Madagascar - Skipper (Tom McGrath)Hotel Transylvania 2 - Frankenstein (Kevin James)The Good Dinosaur - Poppa Henry (Jeffrey Wright)Kung Fu Panda 3 - Master Mantis (Seth Rogen)Zootopia - Mayor Lionheart (J.K. Simmons)Hotel Transylvania 3: Summer Vacation - Frankenstein (Kevin James)Ralph Breaks the Internet - Double Dan (Alfred Molina)

Television animationMagic Roundabout  (2007) - Dylan (Jimmy Hibbert)Kung Fu Panda: Legends of Awesomeness - Master Mantis (Max Koch)The Lion Guard - Janja (Andrew Kishino)

Video gamesJak and Daxter series – Daxter (Max Casella)SSX Tricky – JP Arsenault

Live actionCommander in Chief – Vince Taylor (Anthony Azizi)The Dead Zone – Johnny Smith (Anthony Michael Hall)Fantastic Four – Mister Fantastic (Ioan Gruffudd)Fantastic Four: Rise of the Silver Surfer – Mister Fantastic (Ioan Gruffudd)Law & Order: Special Victims Unit – Doctor George Huang (B. D. Wong)Lost – Jack Shephard (Matthew Fox)Sliders – Quinn Mallory (Robert Floyd)The Pretender – Angelo (Paul Dillon)Threat Matrix – Mohammad 'Mo' Hassain (Anthony Azizi)

Non-dubbing rolesLe Petit Nicolas – Le Bouillon)Mickey Mouse'' – Customer (Episode: "Croissant de Triomphe")

External links

Living people
French male voice actors
Year of birth missing (living people)